Ori Nee Prema Bangaram Kaanu is a 2003 Indian Telugu-language comedy film directed by AVS and starring singer Rajesh in his acting debut and Sangeetha. The film was met with negative reception by critics who criticised Rajesh's acting and the film's lack of story.

Plot 
Rajesh, a poor man, falls in love with Sangeeta. In order to win over his daughter, Sangeeta's father challenges Rajesh to keep ₹1 crore rupees safely in a room for a month. How Rajesh manages to do so and win over Sangeeta forms the rest of the story.

Cast 

Rajesh as Rajesh 
Sangeetha as Sangeeta 
Jayaprakash Reddy as Sangeeta's father
AVS as Gutthi Gurnadham
Ali, Sunil, Ananth Babu and Venu Madhav as Rajesh's classmates
Brahmanandam, Tanikella Bharani, Chalapathi Rao and Raghu Babu as family men
Kovai Sarala
Sana
Anita Chowdary
Rama Prabha
Giri Babu
Dharmavarapu Subramanyam
Surya
 Gundu Hanumantha Rao
M. S. Narayana
Banerjee
 Bandla Ganesh
Tirupathi Prakash
Junior Relangi
Chitram Seenu

Release and reception 
The film was initially scheduled to release on 7 August 2003, but was postponed due to financial problems.

A critic from Sify gave the film a negative review and said that "The film, which is a comedy caper can be labelled as the most pathetic film of the year. This is veteran comedian AVS's second directorial venture, but the comedy scenes fail to evoke any laughter among the audiences. Not even a single scene is interesting and on the whole plainly irritating". Jeevi of Idlebrain.com opined that " Though all the comedy artists of the industry are present in this film, the laughter they created is nil" and that "By directing movies, he [AVS] is only losing all the hard-earned good will". Preetam Akkineni of Full Hyderabad advised viewers to take Tiger Balm before watching the film because of the splitting headache that the film induces.

Box office 
Similar to Uncle (2000), AVS's first film as a producer, this film was also a box office failure.

Awards 
Nandi Awards 2003
Best Female Comedian - Kovai Sarala

Santosham Film Awards 2004
Best Comedy Love Story

References

External links 

2000s Telugu-language films